James Stark Koehler (10 November 1914 in Oshkosh, Wisconsin – 19 June 2006 in Urbana, Illinois) was an American physicist, specializing in metal defects and their interactions. He is known for the eponymous Peach-Koehler stress formula.

Career 
Koehler received in 1935 his bachelor's degree from Oshkosh State Teachers College (now called the University of Wisconsin, Oshkosh). In 1940 he received from the University of Michigan his PhD under David M. Dennison with thesis Hindered rotation in methyl-alcohol. After a postdoc fellowship in 1940–1941, supervised by Frederick Seitz, at the University of Pennsylvania and then another fellowship for about six months in 1941–1942 at the Westinghouse Electric Company in Pittsburgh, he became a physics instructor at Carnegie Tech in early 1942.

Koehler supervised 7 doctoral dissertations at Carnegie Tech (now called Carnegie Mellon University) and 38 doctoral dissertations at the University of Illinois Urbana-Champaign, where he was a faculty member from 1949 until his retirement as professor emeritus in 1981. He was elected in 1949 a Fellow of the American Physical Society. For the academic year 1956–1957 he was a Guggenheim Fellow at the Cavendish Laboratory.

Koehler is also known for the Cooper-Koehler-Marx experiment, the Magnuson-Palmer-Koehler experiment, and the Bauerle-Koehler experiment.

Students 
Several of Koehler's doctoral students were elected Fellows of the American Physical Society:

References

External links
Oral history interview with James Koehler on 6 March 1981, American Institute of Physics, Niels Bohr Library & Archives

1914 births
2006 deaths
University of Wisconsin–Oshkosh alumni
University of Michigan alumni
Carnegie Mellon University faculty
University of Illinois faculty
People from Oshkosh, Wisconsin
Fellows of the American Physical Society
Manhattan Project people